HelioSphera S.A. is a Greek company founded in 2007, with major stakeholders in Greece and the United States of America. Its headquarters is in Athens, Greece, and its production facility is in Tripoli, Greece. The company's primary product is photovoltaic solar panels and modules, made of micromorph thin-film with an annual capacity of 60MWp. The company has significant expertise in solar manufacturing.

History
In January 2008 ground was broken in Tripoli, Greece for the company's production facility. The Micromorph thin-film plant was built in 18 months, from an investment of 180m Euros. The state-of-the-art, 27,000 m2 facility, with a clean room of over 1500 m2 launched production in September 2009. A month later the certification process according to IEC61646 and IEC61730 was completed by TÜV-Rheinland, with two mounting solutions for BIPV and ground mounted systems offered. Production started in the fourth quarter of 2009, and the ramp-up was completed in the third quarter of 2010. In 2010, 92% of the production was exported, and projects in Germany, Italy, Slovakia, France, Greece, Belgium, Israel, the Czech Republic, Japan and elsewhere have been commissioned, including large scale ground mounted systems and medium to small scale rooftop installations.

Products
The company's micromorph modules are manufactured to perform in low light conditions, partial shading or high temperatures. HelioSphera S.A. was one of the first companies to start module production in Greece, is the only thin film (micromorph-Si) producer in Greece.

References

Further reading
 
 Peter Key (November 30, 2009). "HelioSphera solar panel plant in Phila. expected to create 400 jobs". Philadelphia Business Journal. Accessed May 2011.

External links
 
 
 

Manufacturing companies based in Athens
Renewable energy companies of Greece
Greek brands
Solar cells